Chia Boon Leong (1 January 1925 – 20 December 2022) was a Singaporean footballer who competed for China in the 1948 Summer Olympics and for Singapore at the 1954 Asian Games. He was known as "twinkletoes" in the football scene.

Chia was born on 1 January 1925 to philanthropist Chia Yew Siang. He grew up in Pasir Panjang, Singapore. Chia attended Pasir Panjang English School and Raffles Institution.

Chia was a founding member of the Pasir Panjang Rovers.

During World War II and the Japanese occupation of Singapore, Chia studied at a Japanese school in Queen Street in late 1942.

In mid-1943, Chia worked in a telegraphy company, where his work consists of sending and receiving messages in morse code. Every day after work, he would go to Jalan Besar Stadium to play football for the Pasir Panjang Rovers. Chia was also part of a Syonan team that travelled to Malaya to play against the state teams.

Chia died on 20 December 2022, at the age of 97.

References

External links
 

1925 births
2022 deaths
Chinese footballers
Singaporean footballers
China international footballers
Singapore international footballers
Dual internationalists (football)
Olympic footballers of China
Footballers at the 1948 Summer Olympics
Footballers at the 1954 Asian Games
Association football forwards
Singaporean sportspeople of Chinese descent